Poecilasthena dimorpha is a moth in the family Geometridae. It is found in New Caledonia.

References

Moths described in 1979
Poecilasthena
Moths of Australia